Tigdidine (also written Tiguedidine) is a village in the commune of Djamaa, in El Oued Province, Algeria.

References

Neighbouring towns and cities

Populated places in El Oued Province